Elko Mountain is the tallest mountain in the Elko Hills of Elko County, in Nevada, United States. The summit contains several radio towers.

Summit panorama

References

Mountains of Elko County, Nevada
Mountains of Nevada